Silicon Hills is a nickname for the cluster of high-tech companies in the Austin metropolitan area in the U.S. state of Texas. Silicon Hills has been a nickname for Austin since the mid-1990s.  The name is analogous to Silicon Valley, but refers to the hilly terrain on the west side of Austin. High tech industries in the area include enterprise software, semiconductors, corporate R&D, biotechnology, the video game industry, and a variety of startup companies.

Technology companies with offices in the area include Advanced Micro Devices, Amazon.com, Apple Inc., ARM Holdings, Cisco, eBay, ESO, Facebook, Google, IBM, Indeed, Intel, NXP Semiconductors, PayPal, Procore, Silicon Labs, Texas Instruments, Oracle Corporation, Visa, VMWare, and many others. Dell's worldwide headquarters are located in Round Rock, a suburb of Austin.

Venture capital, incubators and accelerators
Austin was one of the top areas for venture capital with investors investing $621 million in 2013 (43% of that went to software and semiconductor firms). Some venture capital investors include Austin Ventures, Central Texas Angels Network, Genesis UT, and Tritium Partners. There are at least 15 startup incubators as well, including: Capital Factory, Austin Technology Incubator, DivInc, Founder's Institute, Tarmac and the IC2 Institute (the incubator for the University of Texas at Austin). Additionally, Austin houses several startup accelerators including Sputnik ATX venture-accelerator, Tech Stars, and Mass Challenge TX.

List of tech companies with a presence in the Austin area

See also

BioValley
Dell Medical School
List of places with "Silicon" names
Silicon Alley
Silicon Valley
Silicon Wadi
Tech Valley
SXSW (South by Southwest) 
University of Texas at Austin
Austin Community College District
United States Army Futures Command

References

High-technology business districts in the United States
Information technology places